Gåstorget (Swedish: "Goose Square") is a small public square in Gamla stan, the old town in central Stockholm, Sweden, situated between the two alleys Överskärargränd and Gåsgränd.

History

Starting in 1730 as a proposal from the City Architect J E Carlberg (1683-1773), turning spaces for horse-drawn vehicles were being created on various locations in the city, mostly for the purpose of facilitating fire fighting, and in 1796 such a space was created on the present location.  Though the square wasn't given an official name, it was occasionally referred to as either Gåsplan ("Goose Plane") or Gåsgtorget, and as proposal in 1981 to name the square after the troubadour Evert Taube (1890-1976) wasn't met with sympathy, the present name was made official instead.

On the square is a one metre tall bronze sculpture on a granite base, Tungviktare ("Heavyweights") from 1967 by the sculptor Sven Lundqvist (1918-).

See also 
 List of streets and squares in Gamla stan
 Sven Vintappares Torg

References

External links 
 Homepage of Inger Säfbom - Photo of the sculpture Tungviktare.

Squares in Stockholm